The UConn Huskies men's basketball program is the intercollegiate men's basketball team of the University of Connecticut, in Storrs, Connecticut. They currently play in the Big East Conference (Big East) and are coached by Dan Hurley.

The Huskies have won 4 NCAA tournament championships (1999, 2004, 2011 and 2014), which puts the program in a tie with Kansas for sixth-most all-time. The Huskies are second in Big East tournament championships with seven, trailing only Georgetown (8). The Huskies also have the most Big East regular season titles with ten and one American Athletic Conference tournament championship. Numerous players have gone on to achieve professional success after their time at UConn, including Clifford Robinson, Ray Allen, Richard Hamilton, Caron Butler, Ben Gordon, Emeka Okafor, Rudy Gay, Charlie Villanueva, Kemba Walker, Shabazz Napier, Jeremy Lamb, and Andre Drummond. The Huskies have participated in 5 NCAA Final Fours (tied for 13th all time) and appeared in the NCAA tournament 33 times. The team has been a number one seed in the NCAA Tournament 5 times, most recently in 2009.

History

Early history
Men's basketball at UConn began in 1901 with a single game played by Connecticut Agricultural College against Windham High School in January of that year. The college team won, and by 1903 basketball was a varsity sport. The team's first African American player was Harrison Fitch, who was controversially benched by coach John Heldman for a 1934 game against the US Coast Guard Academy.One of the first true stars from Connecticut was Hartford's Bernie Fisher. He was captain of the 1945 team, which was the first UConn team to play in Madison Square Garden. The Hartford Courant dubbed him "Swisher Fisher".

Hugh Greer era
After graduating from the Connecticut Agricultural College, former player Hugh Greer returned to his alma mater as a freshman coach. He was later named head coach of the Huskies six games into the 1946–47 season. Greer led Connecticut to a perfect 12–0 mark for the remainder of his first season. Posting a record of 16–2, this was the best single season finish in school history to that point. UConn won 12 Yankee Conference titles under Greer in 16 completed seasons, including ten consecutive titles from 1951 to 1960. Greer also led UConn to its first seven NCAA berths and one NIT appearance while compiling an overall head coaching record of 286–112. Greer died of a heart attack in 1963, ten games into the 1962–63 season. He was replaced by assistant George Wigton, who led them to the Elite Eight.

Jim Calhoun era
Throughout the 1960s and 1970s, Connecticut remained a regional power, winning an additional six Yankee Conference titles before the conference dropped basketball at the end of the 1975–1976 season and earning multiple NCAA tournament berths. In 1979, UConn became one of the seven founding schools of the Big East Conference, which was created to focus on basketball.

Prior to the 1986–87 season UConn hired Northeastern head coach Jim Calhoun to take over the program. Calhoun's first team finished the season with a record of 9–19. In 1988, the team showed significant improvement and gained a berth in the National Invitation Tournament. UConn went on a run in the tournament and defeated Ohio State 72–67 at Madison Square Garden to win the NIT, the school's first national basketball title.

The 1990 "Dream Season" would bring UConn basketball back to the national stage. Led by Chris Smith, Nadav Henefeld, Scott Burrell, Tate George, Rod Sellers and John Gwynn, UConn went from unranked in the preseason to winning the Big East Regular Season and Tournament Championships, both for the first time. 1990 also marked the opening of Gampel Pavilion, the program's new on-campus home. In the NCAA tournament the Huskies garnered a #1 seed in the East Region, but trailed Clemson 70–69 with 1 second remaining in the Sweet 16. Burrell's full-court pass found Tate George on the far baseline. George spun, fired, and hit a buzzer-beater that is known in Connecticut simply as "The Shot". They would be eliminated on a buzzer-beater 2 days later by Duke, losing in overtime 79–78.

During the 1994-1995 campaign, the Huskies hosted Syracuse on ESPN. During an exciting stretch of the second half of that game, ESPN color commentator Dick Vitale claimed that Storrs, CT was the "basketball capital of the world" as both the men's and women's teams were having undefeated seasons so far. The Huskies beat Syracuse but lost to Kansas to end their undefeated season.

UConn continued to rise as a national program throughout the 1990s, winning five more Big East Regular Season and three more Big East tournament championships, as well as reaching several regional finals. The Final Four still eluded Calhoun and the program until the 1999 NCAA tournament. With Richard "Rip" Hamilton leading the way, they claimed the program's first national title that same year. Calhoun's teams would go on to win two more national championships during his tenure at UConn.

Calhoun was inducted into the Basketball Hall of Fame in 2005, and officially announced his retirement in September 2012.

After the breakup of the old Big East in 2013, UConn remained as a member of the American Athletic Conference, the legal successor to the original conference.  Until leaving the AAC in 2020 to join the new Big East, UConn was the only charter member of the original Big East still playing in that conference.

Kevin Ollie era
Kevin Ollie was hired as UConn's men's basketball coach shortly after Calhoun's retirement. Ollie played for Jim Calhoun from 1991 to 1995 and was a key player on those early 1990s Husky teams. During his first season, the Huskies record was 20–10. That year the Huskies were banned from postseason play by the NCAA because of a low APR score in 2010. In Ollie's second season, the team made the NCAA tournament. On March 30, 2014, Ollie became the first UConn coach other than Jim Calhoun to lead the Huskies to a Final Four. They won the Men's NCAA tournament on April 7, 2014, defeating the University of Kentucky 60–54. His team was the first #7 seed to ever win the NCAA tournament. Ollie led Connecticut to the American Athletic Conference tournament championship and another NCAA tournament appearance in 2015–16. The Huskies defeated Colorado 74–67 in the Second Round but were eliminated by the number one overall seed Kansas Jayhawks 73–61 in the third round of the tournament.

Kevin Ollie was fired for just cause related to an NCAA investigation of the program on March 10, 2018.

Dan Hurley era
Former Wagner College and Rhode Island head coach Dan Hurley was introduced by UConn on March 23, 2018 to be the next Head men's basketball coach following the firing of Kevin Ollie.

Facilities

 Greer Fieldhouse (1954-1990)
 XL Center/Hartford Civic Center (1975–present)
 Gampel Pavilion (1990–present)
 Werth Family Champions Center (2014–present)

National Championships

1999 NCAA Title

The Huskies were the top seed in the West region, and a win over Gonzaga in the regional final sent UConn to Tropicana Field for the program's first Final Four appearance. They defeated Ohio State 64–58 in the semi-final to face off against Duke in the final. Despite having been ranked #1 for half of the year, the Huskies entered the national championship game as 9-point underdogs.

UConn won their first national title with a 77–74 victory. Richard Hamilton was named the tournament's Most Outstanding Player.

2004 NCAA Title
In 2004, the Huskies returned to the Final Four. Once again they faced Duke, this time in the National Semifinal, and used a late run to beat the Blue Devils 79–78. Two nights later, led by Emeka Okafor and Ben Gordon, Connecticut won their second national title with an 82–73 victory over Georgia Tech. Okafor was named the tournament's Most Outstanding Player.

One day later the UConn women's basketball team also won a national title, making UConn the first and only school in NCAA Division I history to have its men's and women's basketball programs win a national championship in the same season.

2011 NCAA Title

The 2011 Huskies won 11 straight games in postseason play, the final six of which resulted in the program's third national championship. On April 4, 2011, they defeated the Butler Bulldogs, 53–41. UConn junior Kemba Walker was named the tournament's Most Outstanding Player.

Many consider UConn's win in the Championship Game to be a great defensive performance, as the Huskies held Butler to only 18.8% shooting from the field (a record for field goal percentage defense in a championship game) and tied a title game record with ten blocked shots. An analysis by Sports Illustrated columnist Luke Winn credited the Huskies' defense by demonstrating, for instance, that they blocked or altered a staggering 26.6% of Butler's shots – compared to just 3.8 percent by Pittsburgh and 12.1 percent by VCU in earlier rounds. The 53 points scored by Connecticut was, in turn, the lowest point total by a winning team in a championship game since 1949.

2014 NCAA Title

In 2014 led by American Athletic Conference Player of the Year Shabazz Napier, UConn became the first #7 seed to win the NCAA Championship, getting past No. 1 seed Florida, No. 2 seed Villanova, No. 3 seed Iowa State, and No. 4 seed Michigan State, before defeating the Kentucky Wildcats 60–54 in the championship game in Arlington, Texas. UConn is undefeated in the state of Texas in the Final Four (6–0).

As in 2004, the UConn women's basketball team also won a national title, making UConn the first and only school in NCAA Division I history to have its men's and women's basketball programs win a national championship in the same season twice.

Postseason

NCAA tournament results
The Huskies have appeared in the NCAA tournament 36 times. Their combined record is 59–32. They have been to five Final Fours and are four time National Champions (1999, 2004, 2011, 2014).

NCAA Tournament seeding history
The NCAA began seeding the tournament with the 1979 edition.

NIT results
The Huskies have appeared in the National Invitation Tournament (NIT) 13 times. Their combined record is 15–12. They were NIT champions in 1988.

Coaches
The following is a list of Connecticut Huskies men's basketball head coaches. The team is currently coached by Dan Hurley.

Huskies of Honor

On December 26, 2006, UConn announced inaugural inductees into the "Huskies of Honor" recognition program, a class of 13 players and 3 coaches that were later introduced at halftime during the February 5, 2007 UConn-Syracuse game. Former athletic director John Toner was inducted on February 28, 2009. On April 5, 2011, Kemba Walker was the first men's basketball player to be added to the program since the inaugural inductees, an honor he was bestowed after leading the team to a national championship.

The Huskies of Honor are each recognized by a four by five foot panel which displays his name, jersey number and years of service, and a plaque which summarizes each's career accomplishments; Both the panels and the plaques are on permanent display at Gampel Pavilion on the University of Connecticut campus in Storrs, Connecticut.

Players
Ray Allen 1993–96
Wes Bialosuknia 1964–67
Walt Dropo 1942–47
Khalid El-Amin 1997–2000
Rudy Gay 2004–06
Richard Hamilton 1996–99
Tony Hanson 1973–77
Toby Kimball 1961–65
Donyell Marshall 1991–94
Caron Butler 2000-02
Shabazz Napier 2010–14
Emeka Okafor 2001–04
Art Quimby 1951–55
Clifford Robinson 1985–89
Chris Smith 1988–92
Corny Thompson 1978–82
Kemba Walker 2008–11
Andre Drummond 2011–12

Coaches and administrators
Jim Calhoun, Head Coach, 1986–2012
Dee Rowe, Head Coach, 1969–77
Hugh Greer, Head Coach, 1946–63
John Toner, Athletic Director, 1969–87

Teams
1999 National Championship Team

Retired numbers 

On December 7, 2018, UConn announced that the #34 worn by Ray Allen would be permanently retired, effective with ceremonies to be held during the Huskies' final 2018–19 home game on March 3, 2019. In its announcement, UConn stated that going forward, number retirement would be reserved for former Huskies players inducted into the Naismith Memorial Basketball Hall of Fame, as Allen was earlier that year. 

At the same time, the Huskies announced that the #50 worn by Rebecca Lobo, a 2017 Naismith Hall inductee, would be retired by UConn women's basketball, with ceremonies held during the season's final women's home game on March 2, 2019. 

UConn's announcement did not make it clear whether both numbers would be retired across both men's and women's programs, but a university spokesperson clarified that the retirements applied only to the teams that Allen and Lobo competed for, meaning that #50 will remain available in men's basketball and #34 in women's.

Notable victories

February 27, 1954 – Worthy Patterson's buzzer-beater at Holy Cross gave UConn an upset of the then-powerhouse Crusaders, 78–77.
March 14, 1964 – UConn upset Princeton and star forward Bill Bradley 52–50 in the Sweet 16. The victory was sealed when Dom Perno stole the ball from Bradley with 19 seconds to play. Perno would later become UConn's coach.
February 28, 1970 ("The Slowdown Game") – With four players unavailable and a share of the Yankee Conference Regular-Season Championship on the line, UConn beat Rhode Island 35–32 at the Field House. Played before the shot clock-era, UConn dribbled endlessly for 38 minutes to make up for the limited roster.
March 30, 1988 – UConn defeated Ohio State 72–67 at Madison Square Garden to win the NIT.
January 27, 1990 – UConn beat #15 St. John's 72–58 in the first game played at Gampel Pavilion.
March 11, 1990 – UConn beat Syracuse 78–75 at Madison Square Garden to win its first Big East tournament Championship.
March 22, 1990 ("The Shot") – Tate George made a shot at the buzzer to beat Clemson 71–70 in the 1990 Sweet 16 at Brendan Byrne Arena in East Rutherford, New Jersey.
March 9, 1996 – With 4 minutes remaining, UConn trailed Georgetown 74–63. The Huskies closed the game with a 12–0 run and won the Big East Championship 75–74 on an off-balance floater from All-American Ray Allen at Madison Square Garden.
March 20, 1998 (Hamilton "Rips" Washington's heart out) – Down 74–73 in the Sweet Sixteen to the eleven seed Washington Huskies, two seed UConn gets three shot attempts off in the final 15 seconds with Rip Hamilton's buzzer beating jumper winning it 75-74.
March 29, 1999 – UConn won its first NCAA Championship, defeating Duke 77–74 at Tropicana Field in St. Petersburg, Florida.
April 5, 2004 – UConn won its second NCAA Championship, defeating Georgia Tech 82–73 at the Alamodome in San Antonio.
March 28. 2009 – defeated Missouri 82–75 to win the Arizona Regional Final and advance to their third Final Four
March 12, 2011 – In the final of the Big East tournament, the Huskies defeated Louisville by a score of 69–66 to claim their seventh Big East Championship. The victory capped an unprecedented run wherein the Huskies won five tournament games in five consecutive days. Four of those wins came against top-25 opponents. Junior All-American guard Kemba Walker scored a tournament-record 130 points in the five-game run, and was named tournament MVP.
April 4, 2011 – The Huskies defeated Butler 53–41 to claim the NCAA Championship in Houston's Reliant Stadium.
November 9, 2012 – In Kevin Ollie's first game as Connecticut head coach the Huskies beat the #14 Michigan State Spartans 66–62 at Ramstein Air Base in Germany.
March 30, 2014 – The Huskies defeat Michigan State 60–54 at Madison Square Garden to advance to the Final Four for the fifth time.
April 7, 2014 – The Huskies defeated Kentucky 60–54 to win the 2014 NCAA Championship at AT&T Stadium in Arlington, Texas.
March 11, 2016 – With 0.8 seconds remaining and UConn down by 3, Freshman point guard Jalen Adams hits a 60-foot 3 pointer to tie an American Conference tournament quarterfinal game vs Cincinnati and force a fourth overtime. UConn would win the game 104-97, the final against Memphis two days later and advance to the 2016 NCAA men's basketball tournament.

Awards
Source

AP National Coach of the Year
Jim Calhoun – 1990

NABC National Player of the Year
Emeka Okafor – 2004

Consensus First Team All-Americans
Donyell Marshall – 1994
Ray Allen – 1996
Richard Hamilton – 1999
Emeka Okafor – 2004
Kemba Walker – 2011
Shabazz Napier – 2014

National Defensive Player of the Year
Emeka Okafor – 2003, 2004
Hasheem Thabeet – 2008, 2009

Pete Newell Big Man Award
Emeka Okafor – 2004

Bob Cousy Award
Kemba Walker – 2011
Shabazz Napier – 2014

Big East Player of the Year
Donyell Marshall – 1994
Ray Allen – 1996
Richard Hamilton – 1998, 1999
Caron Butler – 2002
Emeka Okafor – 2004
Hasheem Thabeet – 2009

AAC Player of the Year
Shabazz Napier – 2014
Big East Conference Men's Basketball Most Improved Player
Marcus Williams – 2004
American Athletic Conference Most Improved Player
Josh Carlton – 2019

Big East Defensive Player of the Year
Donyell Marshall – 1994
Emeka Okafor – 2003, 2004
Josh Boone – 2005
Hilton Armstrong – 2006
Hasheem Thabeet – 2008, 2009
Isaiah Whaley – 2020

Big East Sixth Man of the Year
Tyler Polley – 2020

AAC Defensive Player of the Year
Amida Brimah – 2015

Big East tournament MVP
Chris Smith – 1990
Khalid El-Amin – 1998
Kevin Freeman – 1999
Caron Butler – 2002
Ben Gordon – 2004
Kemba Walker – 2011

AAC Tournament MVP
Daniel Hamilton – 2016

Big East Coach of the Year
Jim Calhoun – 1990, 1994, 1996, 1998

Big East Rookie of the Year
Earl Kelley – 1983
Nadav Henefeld – 1990
Doron Sheffer – 1994
Khalid El-Amin – 1998
Rudy Gay – 2005

NCAA Tournament MOP
Richard Hamilton – 1999
Emeka Okafor – 2004
Kemba Walker – 2011
Shabazz Napier – 2014

AAC Rookie of the Year
Daniel Hamilton – 2015

Impact on the NBA

Since the 1990s, UConn has been recognized as being a consistent pipeline for players to enter the National Basketball Association. During the 2006–2007 season, there were an NBA-high 14 former Huskies on active rosters. During the 2013–14 season, 13 former Huskies were on active NBA rosters.

UConn has had 13 players selected as lottery picks in the NBA draft:

The 2006 Draft class was notable for tying the record of most first-round picks from one school, with four. With five players drafted in the two rounds, UConn tied for the second-most ever taken in an NBA draft.
Two players (Clifford Robinson, 1992–93, and Ben Gordon, 2004–05) have been winners of the NBA Sixth Man of the Year Award.
Emeka Okafor was the winner of the 2004–05 NBA Rookie of the Year Award.
Ray Allen was the winner of the 2002–03 NBA Sportsmanship Award, and retired as the all-time leading scorer in 3-point field goals made.
Five players (Scott Burrell, '97–'98, Travis Knight, '99–'00, Richard Hamilton, '03–'04, Ray Allen, '07–'08 and '12–'13, Caron Butler, '10–'11) have won NBA championships.

NBA Players Past and Present

Adrien, Jeff 2010–2015
Aleksinas, Chuck 1984–1985
Allen, Ray 1996–2014
Armstrong, Hilton 2006–2014
Bialosuknia, Wes 1967–1968
Boone, Josh 2006–2010
Bouknight, James 2021–present
Burrell, Scott 1993–2000
Butler, Caron 2002–2016
Drummond, Andre 2012–present
Dyson, Jerome 2012
El-Amin, Khalid 2000–2002
Foster, Jimmy 1974–1975
Gay, Rudy 2006–present
George, Tate 1990–1994
Gordon, Ben 2004–2015
Hamilton, Daniel 2017–2019
Hamilton, Richard 1999–2013
Kimball, Toby 1966–1974
Knight, Travis 1996–2002
Kuczenski, Bruce 1983–1984
Lamb, Jeremy 2012–present
Marshall, Donny 1995–2002
Marshall, Donyell 1994–2009
Napier, Shabazz 2014–2020
Okafor, Emeka 2004–2013, 2018
Ollie, Kevin 1997–2010
Patterson, Worthy 1957
Price, A.J. 2009–2015
Rodney Purvis 2018
Robinson, Clifford  1989–2006
Smith, Chris 1992–1994
Thabeet, Hasheem 2009–2014
Thompson, Corny 1982–1983
Villanueva, Charlie 2005–2016
Voskuhl, Jake 2000–2009
Walker, Kemba 2011–present
Williams, Marcus 2006–2010

Huskies in international leagues

Jalen Adams (born 1995), basketball player for Hapoel Jerusalem in the Israeli Basketball Premier League

References

External links